Trégunc is a commune in the Finistère department of Brittany, western France.

Population
Inhabitants of Trégunc are called in French Trégunois or Tréguncois.

Cultural heritage 
 Saint-Philibert's chapel (Trégunc): 16th-century chapel.
 Château de Kerminaouet

Breton language
In 2008, 7.19% of primary-school children attended bilingual schools.

Notable people 
 Jeanne Boutbien, French-Senegalese swimmer, 2020 Summer Olympian

Gallery

See also
Communes of the Finistère department

References

External links

Official website 

Mayors of Finistère Association 

 
Communes of Finistère